Beach volleyball, for the 2017 Island Games, held at the ICA Maxi Arena, Visby, Gotland, Sweden in June 2017.

Medal table

Results

2017 in beach volleyball
Beach volleyball 2017
Beach volleyball
2017